

The St. Louis YPT-15 was an American two-seat primary training biplane, built by the St. Louis Aircraft Corporation for use by the United States Army Air Corps. 13 examples of the type were acquired, serving in the late 1930s.

Design and development
The PT-15 was a development of the "off-the-shelf" PT-1W for use by the U.S. Army Air Corps, ordered for stop-gap duty in the training of airmen in the build-up to World War II. The wings were fabric covered, but the fuselage was aluminum covered. A single Wright R-760 radial engine of  provided power.

Operational history
One prototype PT-1 crashed at Wright field trials on 23 May 1936 bearing the serial number of an older design, the St. Louis PT-35
All thirteen examples of the YPT-15 were locally assigned (as PT-15s) to Parks College Civilian Pilot Training Program. The PT-15 was the only St. Louis design ever acquired by the Army Air Corps.

Variants 
XPT-15 (St. Louis Model PT-1, and PT-1W replacement prototype)
One Model PT-1W obtained for evaluation with a 235 hp Wright Whirlwind R-760ET.
YPT-15 (St. Louis Model PT-2)
13 pre-production aircraft with changes to instrumentation, 285hp Wright Whirlwind R-760E-1, and larger rudder. Later designated PT-15.

There is at least one YPT-15 still in existence. It is located at the Western Antique Aeroplane & Automobile Museum in Hood River, Oregon and is maintained in airworthy condition.

Specifications (PT-15)

See also

References 
Notes

Citations

Bibliography

 
 Illustrated Encyclopedia of Aircraft, Aerospace Publishing/Orbis Publishing

External links
 St. Louis PT-15
 PT - Primary Trainer aircraft

PT-015
1940s United States military trainer aircraft
Single-engined tractor aircraft
Biplanes
World War II aircraft of the United States
Aircraft first flown in 1936